Woleu-Ntem is the northernmost of Gabon's nine provinces. It covers an area of 38,465 km and named after Woleu and Ntem rivers that cross it. The provincial capital is Oyem, which had a total of 60,685 inhabitants in 2013.

As Woleu-Ntem is the most northerly province of Gabon, it is the only province that borders Cameroon, and the only one with multiple foreign borders (other two being the Republics of the Congo and of Equatorial Guinea).  It borders the following areas of these countries:

Sangha Department, Republic of the Congo – east
South Province, Cameroon – north
Kié-Ntem Province, Equatorial Guinea – northwest, north of Wele-Nzas
Wele-Nzas Province, Equatorial Guinea – northwest, east of Centro Sur and south of Kié-Ntem
Centro Sur Province, Equatorial Guinea – northwest, west of Wele-Nzas

Domestically, it borders the following provinces:
Estuaire – southwest
Moyen-Ogooué – south
Ogooué-Ivindo – southeast

Departments

Woleu-Ntem is divided into 5 departments:
Haut-Komo (department) (Médouneu)
Haut-Ntem (department) (Minvoul)
Ntem (department) (Bitam)
Okano (department) (Mitzic)
Woleu (department) (Oyem)

References

Sources
 The World Factbook
 https://www.amazinggabon.com/en/woleu-ntem-province/
 https://www.citypopulation.de/php/gabon-admin.php?adm1id=9
 https://www.fotw.info/flags/ga-wn.html

 
Provinces of Gabon